Major-General Reginald Kingscote "Rex" Hewer  (189215 November 1970) was a British Army cavalry officer.

Early life 
Hewer was educated at Bloxham School, where he was a member of the Officer Training Corps.

Military career 
Hewer was commissioned into the Royal Field Artillery on 12 October 1914, and saw active service in the First World War. He was awarded the Military Cross on 17 December 1917. Following the war he served with the 7th Dragoon Guards, and later with the 7th Queen's Own Hussars. Between the wars, he held command positions in the Royal Armoured Corps.

At the start of the Second World War, Hewer was serving as Deputy Assistant Quartermaster-General, War Office. Between 1939 and 1940 he fought in the Battle of France as Assistant Quartermaster-General of Movements with the British Expeditionary Force. Following the fall of France he was appointed OBE for his part in organising the Dunkirk evacuation and posted to Middle East Command, first as Assistant Adjutant & Quartermaster-General, and then later Director of Movements with the same formation in the temporary rank of Brigadier. Hewer was Mentioned in Dispatches for services in the Middle East on 30 December 1941. He was promoted to the substantive rank of colonel on 27 June 1942 and advanced to Commander in the Order of the British Empire on 9 September 1942. Hewer was made Acting Major-General on 28 March 1943. He was further mentioned in dispatches on 6 April 1944 for distinguished service in the Middle East.

United Nations 
Between 1945 and 1947 Hewer was Deputy Director-General of the United Nations European Central Inland Transport Organization. He retired on 29 May 1948 and was granted the honorary rank of Major-General.

References

1892 births
1970 deaths
7th Dragoon Guards officers
7th Queen's Own Hussars officers
British Army generals of World War II
British Army personnel of World War I
Commanders of the Order of the British Empire
Companions of the Order of the Bath
People educated at Bloxham School
Recipients of the Military Cross
Royal Armoured Corps officers
Royal Field Artillery officers
Royal Artillery officers